Elections to Lisburn City Council were held on 5 May 2005 on the same day as the other Northern Irish local government elections. The election used five district electoral areas to elect a total of 30 councillors.

Election results

Note: "Votes" are the first preference votes.

Districts summary

|- class="unsortable" align="centre"
!rowspan=2 align="left"|Ward
! % 
!Cllrs
! % 
!Cllrs
! %
!Cllrs
! %
!Cllrs
! % 
!Cllrs
! %
!Cllrs
!rowspan=2|TotalCllrs
|- class="unsortable" align="center"
!colspan=2 bgcolor="" | DUP
!colspan=2 bgcolor="" | UUP
!colspan=2 bgcolor="" | Sinn Féin
!colspan=2 bgcolor="" | Alliance
!colspan=2 bgcolor="" | SDLP
!colspan=2 bgcolor="white"| Others
|-
|align="left"|Downshire
|bgcolor="#D46A4C"|48.7
|bgcolor="#D46A4C"|2
|36.8
|2
|1.3
|0
|13.2
|1
|0.0
|0
|0.0
|0
|5
|-
|align="left"|Dunmurry Cross
|13.6
|1
|6.7
|0
|bgcolor="#008800"|58.2
|bgcolor="#008800"|4
|0.0
|0
|21.5
|2
|0.0
|0
|7
|-
|align="left"|Killultagh
|bgcolor="#D46A4C"|48.4
|bgcolor="#D46A4C"|3
|21.5
|1
|7.7
|0
|6.9
|0
|11.6
|1
|3.9
|0
|5
|-
|align="left"|Lisburn Town North
|bgcolor="#D46A4C"|44.6
|bgcolor="#D46A4C"|3
|31.8
|3
|2.3
|0
|12.7
|1
|5.8
|0
|2.8
|0
|7
|-
|align="left"|Lisburn Town South
|bgcolor="#D46A4C"|59.8
|bgcolor="#D46A4C"|4
|17.3
|1
|2.7
|0
|17.7
|1
|2.6
|0
|0.0
|0
|6
|- class="unsortable" class="sortbottom" style="background:#C9C9C9"
|align="left"| Total
|40.7
|13
|22.7
|7
|16.6
|4
|9.2
|3
|8.5
|3
|2.3
|0
|30
|-
|}

Districts results

Downshire

2001: 3 x UUP, 1 x DUP, 1 x Alliance
2005: 2 x DUP, 2 x UUP, 1 x Alliance
2001-2005 Change: DUP gain from UUP

Dunmurry Cross

2001: 4 x Sinn Féin, 2 x SDLP, 1 x UUP
2005: 4 x Sinn Féin, 2 x SDLP, 1 x DUP
2001-2005 Change: DUP gain from UUP

Killultagh

2001: 2 x UUP, 2 x DUP, 1 x SDLP
2005: 3 x DUP, 1 x UUP, 1 x SDLP
2001-2005 Change: DUP gain from UUP

Lisburn Town North

2001: 4 x UUP, 1 x Alliance, 1 x DUP, 1 x Independent
2005: 3 x DUP, 3 x UUP, 1 x Alliance
2001-2005 Change: DUP (two seats) gain from UUP and Independent

Lisburn Town South

2001: 3 x UUP, 1 x Alliance, 1 x DUP, 1 x Independent
2005: 4 x DUP, 1 x UUP, 1 x Alliance
2001-2005 Change: DUP (three seats) gain from UUP (two seats) and Independent

References

Lisburn City Council elections
2005 Northern Ireland local elections